Ivan's Hammer refers to the theoretical use of a natural asteroid or meteoroid as a weapon of mass destruction in a first-strike role. The concept can be traced back to the 1960s. At the annual meeting of the American Astronautical Society, in January, 1962 Dandridge M. Cole warned that as early as 1970 the Soviets could develop the technology to divert a near earth asteroid to impact a target on earth.
 
During the late 1960s and early 1970s a number of science fiction writers used the concept in story ideas, most notably Robert Heinlein in The Moon is a Harsh Mistress (1966) where a rebellious Lunar colony uses large payloads of mined ore to bombard Earth from the Moon; Rendezvous with Rama by Arthur C. Clarke (1972); and Lucifer's Hammer by Larry Niven and Jerry Pournelle (1977). Modified concepts that utilized large man-made constructions can be seen in Mobile Suit Gundam and its derivative series, where large space colonies were dropped onto Earth, sometimes right onto population centers.

A RAND Corporation study from 2002 also discusses the method and feasibility of such an application, and Carl Sagan discusses the idea at length in Pale Blue Dot.

See also 
Directed-energy weapon
Laser weapon
Space weapon

References 

Space weapons